High Royds, a small mining community near Barnsley in South Yorkshire is not to be confused with High Royds, near Menston in West Yorkshire, served by the Wharfedale Line and the site of a former mental health institution. 

 	
The station opened on 4 September 1854 and closed just two years later, one of the most short-lived stations in the county.

Route

References
"The South Yorkshire Railway", D.L.Franks, Turntable Enterprises, 1971. 

Disused railway stations in Barnsley
Railway stations in Great Britain opened in 1854
Railway stations in Great Britain closed in 1856
Former South Yorkshire Railway stations